The Novo Nordisk Foundation is an international enterprise foundation focusing on medical treatment and research.

In 2021, the foundation had a net worth of $93.73 billion (697 billion DKK), making it the wealthiest charitable foundation in the world. Novo Nordisk Foundation owns Novo Holdings A/S, a holding company that is the majority shareholder of Novo Nordisk, a Danish pharmaceutical corporation.

From 2010 to 2015, the foundation distributed more than US$1.3 billion for research, innovation, treatment, education and humanitarian and social purposes.

In 2021, the foundation awarded grants worth $1.18 billion (8.8 billion DKK) and paid out $0.65 billion (4.8 billion DKK).

The Foundation typically distributes more than US$300 million each year to research within the fields of Life sciences and Bioscience. While the main focus lies within biomedicine and biotechnology research, the Foundation also awards grants for research in general practice and family medicine, nursing and art history.

History 
In 1922, Danish professor August Krogh received permission to produce insulin in the Nordic countries. This sparked the development of new diabetes treatments and the beginning of a Danish business and export venture. Several foundations were also established which have subsequently merged into the Novo Nordisk Foundation.

In recent years, the Foundation has increased its focus on innovation, diabetes treatment and grants for humanitarian and social purposes. In 2016 the Foundation awarded a little over 420 million US dollars to the Capital Region of Denmark to establish Steno Diabetes Center in Copenhagen, a diabetes treatment and research institution.

Constellation and ownership structure 
The Novo Nordisk Foundation is an established enterprise foundation. It is a self-governing entity with no owners, focusing on long-term ownership of the Novo Group (Novo Nordisk and Novozymes) while combining business and philanthropy within scientific, humanitarian and social purposes. The Novo Nordisk Foundation's investment activities are managed by its 100%-owned subsidiary, Novo Holdings A/S which sole purpose is to invest the foundations wealth and ensure financial returns. 

Novo Holdings A/S is also the holding company for the foundation's ownership in Novo Group (Novo Nordisk and Novozymes).

Ownership structure 
The Novo Nordisk Foundation is obligated to maintain its controlling ownership in the Novo Groups two largest companies: Novo Nordisk and Novozymes.

 The foundation owns class A and B-shares in Novo Nordisk corresponding to approximately 28 percent of the total equity and approximately 75 percent of the total voting rights.
 The foundation owns class A and B-shares in Novozymes corresponding to approximately 25 percent of the total equity and approximately 71 percent of the total voting rights.

The class A-shares in both companies (Novo Nordisk and Novozymes) are unlisted and cannot be traded. The voting weight of the A-shares are 10 times those of B-shares in both companies.

Profits and taxation 
The Novo Nordisk Foundation receives cashflows and profits from paid dividends from Novo Holdings A/S. The paid dividends are taxed in the underlying companies in correspondence with Danish corporate tax laws, prior to being paid out as dividends.

Endowment 
The Novo Nordisk Foundation is the primary owner of Novo Nordisk A/S and Novozymes A/S through the foundation's subsidiary company Novo Holdings A/S. Aside from Novo Nordisk and Novozymes, the foundation is also a major shareholder in more than 75 other companies. The foundation's financial endowment is maintained by dividends and returns on these investments.

Distribution of grants 
The foundation has an objective of providing support for scientific, humanitarian and social purposes.

The grants go primarily to support research in biomedicine, biotechnology, general medicine, nursing and art history at public knowledge institutions. Humanitarian and social purposes includes the Steno Diabetes Center research hospital. In addition, the Novo Nordisk Foundation also awards a number of awards each year aiming to recognize and reward individuals for "outstanding research, teaching, or other support for research".

Annual distribution summary 
In 2021, the foundation distributed a total of DKK 8.8 billion (approx $1.18 billion) and paid out DKK 4.8 billion ($0.65 billion) in grants.

In 2020, the foundation distributed a total of DKK 10.17 billion (approx $1.67 billion) and paid out DKK 4.6 billion ($0.75 billion) in grants.

In 2019, the foundation distributed a total of DKK 8.5 billion (approx $1.29 billion) and paid out DKK 3.6 billion ($0.57 billion) in grants.

In 2018, the foundation distributed a total of DKK 3.9 billion (approx $0.59 billion) and paid out DKK 1,75 billion ($0.28 billion) in grants.

In 2017, the foundation distributed support for DKK 5.8 billion (approx $0.88 billion)

In 2016, the fund provided support for DKK 4.2 billion (approx $0.64 billion).

COVID-19 pandemic 
The Novo Nordisk Foundation contributed to support the fight against the COVID-19 pandemic in the spring of 2020.

The foundation (as of June 2020) has donated DKK 366.2 million (approx $55.77 million) for COVID-19 related measures.

 Test centers in Denmark: DKK 250 million for 11 COVID-19 test centers throughout Denmark.
 Projects: DKK 74.9 million  for 43 different projects aimed at mitigating the health consequences of COVID-19 in Denmark.
 Emergency production of ethanol: DKK 17.5 million granted in cooperation with The Carlsberg Foundation for emergency production of ethanol for hand sanitizers and disinfection.
 Research projects: DKK 6.6 million for three research projects.
 Trials: DKK 5 million in support for trials for anti-inflammatory drugs against COVID-19 in collaboration with Rigshospitalet.

Leadership 
The current chairman of the Novo Nordisk Foundation is Lars Rebien Sørensen and Mads Krogsgaard Thomsen is the current CEO.

See also 
 List of wealthiest foundations
 Financial endowment
 Private foundation
 Foundation (nonprofit)

References

Medical research institutes in Denmark
Charities based in Denmark